The 2019–20 season is Virtus Roma's 60th in existence and the club's 1st season in the Lega Basket Serie A after the promotion in the top flight of Italian basketball.

Overview 
Virtus Roma comes back to the Serie A after five years in Serie A2. Roma gained the promotion to the highest Italian league by ending the 2018–19 Serie A2 season at the first place in the West division.

The 2019-20 season was hit by the coronavirus pandemic that compelled the federation to suspend and later cancel the competition without assigning the title to anyone. Roma ended the championship in 14th position.

Kit 
Supplier: EYE Sport Wear

Players 
Due to the early conclusion of the season the new hire Corey Webster couldn't play any game, while Jaylen Barford, coming from Pesaro, was called only in the last game against Sassari.

Current roster

Depth chart

Squad changes

In

|}

Out

|}

Confirmed 

|}

Coach

Unsuccessful deals 
The following deal never activated and the player's contract was withdrawn before the beginning of the season.

Competitions

Serie A

References 

2019–20 in Italian basketball by club